This is a list of the busiest airports in the Baltic states in terms of total number of Passengers, Aircraft movements and Freight and Mail Tonnes per year. The statistics includes major airports in the Baltic States with commercial regular traffic. Aircraft movements and Freight and Mail Tonnes only include statistics for the 5 busiest airports in 2012 since reliable data is not available for all airports. Included are also a list of the Busiest Air Routes to/from and between the Baltic States for 2011 and 2012, data for 2019 will be added as soon as the data becomes available.

Passengers

Graph Summary

Table

2022 statistics

2021 statistics

2020 statistics

2019 statistics

2018 statistics

2017 statistics

2013 statistics

2012 statistics

Aircraft movements

2019 statistics

2012 statistics

Freight and Mail Tonnes

2021 statistics

2012 statistics

Busiest Air Routes
Busiest nonstop air routes within and to/from the Baltic States based on total annually carried passengers on each route. Inter-Baltic routes are Bolded.

2019 statistics

Source

2011 statistics
The routes ranked no 1, 2, 5, 10, 11, 12, 14, 17 and 22 includes the following airports:

No 1:  London Stansted Airport and Gatwick Airport
No 2:  London Stansted Airport, London Luton Airport and Gatwick Airport
No 5:  Stockholm Arlanda Airport and Stockholm Skavsta Airport
No 10: Gatwick Airport, London Stansted Airport and London Luton Airport
No 11: Milan Malpensa Airport and Orio al Serio Airport
No 12: Brussels Airport and Brussels South Charleroi Airport
No 14: Stockholm Arlanda Airport and Stockholm Skavsta Airport
No 17: London Luton Airport and London Stansted Airport
No 22: Oslo Airport, Gardermoen and Moss Airport, Rygge

Gallery

See also

List of airports in Estonia
List of airports in Latvia
List of airports in Lithuania
List of the busiest airports in the Nordic countries
List of the busiest airports in the former Soviet Union
List of the busiest airports in Europe

Notelist

References

State Joint Stock Company (SJSC) Riga International Airport of the Republic of Latvia
Tallinn Airport Ltd
State Enterprise Vilnius International Airport
State Enterprise Kaunas International Airport
State Enterprise Palanga International Airport

Baltic states
Baltic states-related lists
Busiest
Busiest
Busiest
Baltic States
Estonia transport-related lists
Latvia transport-related lists
Lithuania transport-related lists